Saphenista simillima is a species of moth of the family Tortricidae. It is found on Cuba.

The wingspan is about 9 mm. The ground colour of the forewings is whitish cream with some pale brownish-cream suffusions and brownish dots. The markings are yellowish brown. The hindwings are pale brownish, but transparent in the basal half.

Etymology
The species name refers to great genital similarity to Saphenista semistrigata.

References

Moths described in 2007
Saphenista
Endemic fauna of Cuba